Harrow Chequers Football Club was a football club from London, England in the 1860s to early 1890s.  It played as the Harrow Chequers from 1865 to 1876, when it was then renamed the Old Harrovians, and continued play until at least 1891.  Derived from former pupils of Harrow School, the club was involved in the formation of the FA Cup in 1871.  It was slated to play in three of the first six FA Cup competitions in the 1870s, but they forfeited each time, and never contested an FA Cup match as the Chequers.  One of their players, however, Morton Betts, is remembered for scoring the first (and only) goal in the first ever FA Cup Final in 1872, which is essentially all that is remembered today of the club.  However, as the Old Harrovians, the team had some more success, including reaching the semifinals of the 1877–78 FA Cup.

History

Harrow Chequers

The club was formed in 1865, "consisting of Harrovians past and present", and its first reported game was in November that year. 

Charles W. Alcock, the creator of the FA Cup, was a graduate of Harrow.  He likely derived the concept of the competition from Harrow's tradition of houses playing an annual knock-out tournament where the winning house was named the "Cock House."  The Harrow Chequers was slated to be one of the twelve teams involved in the first FA Cup in 1871-1872.  They drew Wanderers in the first round, which was also a team primarily made up of Harrow graduates.  Indeed, one 1869 match report stated that the Wanderers and Chequers consisted of "almost the same team" of men.  In any event, the Chequers withdrew and thus the Wanderers advanced on a walkover.   

The Wanderers eventually advanced to the final, and won 1-0 against the Royal Engineers. The winning goal in that match was scored by Morton Betts, who played under the pseudonym "A.H. Chequer", i.e. "A Harrow Chequer", the team for which he had previously played. It is sometimes suggested in modern times that he played under a fake name to avoid being cup-tied, but he had not played in the competition for another side, and it is more likely that it may have simply been a whimsical adoption. 

The Chequers' next "appearance" in the FA Cup was in the 1874–75 competition.  They were drawn against Civil Service, but again withdrew so that also was a walkover to the opposition in the first round.   The same occurrence happened in the next Cup against Leyton.

In 1876, the Athletic News reported that the club had changed its name to the "Old Harrovians"  The name "Old Harrovians" had previously been used to describe matches contested by old Harrow pupils, such as against Old Etonians, but in any event, the Chequers name ceased to be used after that time.  Thus the name change could also be considered a "merger" of the teams, as some sources have described it.

Old Harrovians
 Under its new name, the team played in the FA Cup competitions regularly in the late 1870s and 1880s.  Though they lost 2–1 to the Royal Engineers in the first round of the 1876–77 FA Cup, the 1877–78 FA Cup saw the team's greatest success.  They defeated 105th Regiment 2–0 in the first round, and then beat 1st Surrey Rifles in the second. Following a 2–2 draw against Cambridge University in the third round, the first replay also ended 2–2, before a second replay saw Old Harrovians win 2–0 to advance to the fourth round.  Of the three-match battle with Cambridge, The Athletic World commented that Cambridge "was only beaten by the 'Ex-Harrow Boys' after two drawn games, Harrow playing men who would have otherwise have played in the opposing team."

In the fourth round, they defeated Upton Park 3–1, putting them into the semi-finals and needing only to beat the Royal Engineers to face the Wanderers (who had a bye) in the final. However, they lost 2–1 in the semi-finals on 16 March 1878; the Harrovians took the lead, but, just before half-time, captain R. de C. Welch suffered an eye injury, which required him to go in goal for the remainder of the match, "weakening his side considerably"; the Sappers duly scored twice in the second half to go through.  There were obviously no hard feelings between the sides, as the Sappers nominated the Old Harrovian half-back Beaumont Jarrett as its umpire for the final.

The following season saw another cup run as the team beat Southill Park 8–0 in the first round and Panthers 3–0 in the second, before losing 2–0 to Nottingham Forest in their third match. 

From then onwards, the club's fortunes diminished; in the 1879–80 FA Cup they lost 2–1 to Finchley in the first round. In 1880–81, they drew with Maidenhead United in the first round, and then lost in a replay. In the 1881–82 FA Cup, they beat Olympic 4–2 in the first round before a 7–1 defeat to Swifts in the second.   

The club did not appear in FA Cup again until 1885–86, first talking a walkover over St James, then beating Old Foresters 2–1.  But they were then disqualified in their third round match against Swifts. In the 1886–87 FA Cup, Old Westminsters defeated Old Harrovians 4–0 in the first round. And in the 1887–88 FA Cup, the Old Harrovians defeated Hendon 4–2 in the first round but lost to the Old Brightonians in the second, a match which would be their last appearance in the proper rounds of the FA Cup.

In the 1888–89 season, due to the large increase in entrants, the FA Cup started to incorporate qualifying rounds. That season, the Old Harrovians defeated Rochester 4–2 in the first qualifying round, but lost 1–0 to Crusaders of Brentwood in the next match. The following season, the club lost their first qualifying match 4–2 to Norwich Thorpe, a result which was repeated in 1890–91 when they were defeated by Gravesend.  The last recorded entry for the club was in 1892–93, losing to Old Wykehamists F.C. in the preliminary round.

Current status

As an exclusively Old Harrovian side, the club remains active, and a member of the Arthurian League.

Colours

The club played in blue and white "chequers", the term used for quartered shirts at the time, the shade confirmed as dark in 1877.

Ground

The club played its home matches at Kennington Oval, the home of Surrey County Cricket Club; Charles Alcock was secretary of both Surrey and the Chequers.

Legacy
In 1891, an article in Fores's Sporting Notes reviewed a copy of the 1874 Football Annual, which commented on the fact that clubs could come and go over time. The 1874 annual listed less than 200 football clubs in all of England, and the author asked "what has become of such old giants as the Gitanos, Harrow Chequers, Pilgrims, and Woodford Wells."

References 

Defunct football clubs in England
Defunct football clubs in London
1865 establishments in England
Association football clubs established in 1865
Harrow School